Bolshesukhoyazovo (Olo Suxoyaz; , Kugu Sokaza) is a rural locality (a village) and the administrative centre of Bolshesukhoyazovsky Selsoviet, Mishkinsky District, Bashkortostan, Russia. The population was 604 as of 2010. There are 11 streets.

Geography 
Bolshesukhoyazovo is located 40 km west of Mishkino (the district's administrative centre) by road. Kurmanayevo is the nearest rural locality.

References 

Rural localities in Mishkinsky District